Guy Delhumeau (born 14 January 1947 ) is a French former professional footballer who played as a goalkeeper. He notably played professionally for Paris Saint-Germain, Paris FC, Boulogne, and Nice, and represented France at the 1968 Summer Olympics.

References

External links
 Player profile
 Interview

1947 births
Living people
Sportspeople from Vienne
French footballers
Paris Saint-Germain F.C. players
Paris FC players
US Boulogne players
OGC Nice players
Championnat de France Amateur (1935–1971) players
Ligue 2 players
Ligue 1 players
French Division 3 (1971–1993) players
Olympic footballers of France
Footballers at the 1968 Summer Olympics
Stade Poitevin FC players
Association football goalkeepers
Footballers from Nouvelle-Aquitaine